Sulphur Springs Cemetery is a historic cemetery in rural northern Yell County, Arkansas. There are at least two known unmarked burials, and fieldstones in the cemetery may denote further sites. The cemetery is ringed by a barbed wire fence. It is one of the few surviving remnants of the former spa community of Sulphur Springs, which flourished here in the 19th century.

The cemetery was listed on the National Register of Historic Places in 2012.

See also
 National Register of Historic Places listings in Yell County, Arkansas

References

Cemeteries on the National Register of Historic Places in Arkansas
National Register of Historic Places in Yell County, Arkansas
Buildings and structures completed in 1844
1844 establishments in Arkansas
Cemeteries established in the 1840s